Stanislaus Pascal Franchot II (January 30, 1851 – March 24, 1908) was an American civil engineer and politician from New York.

Life
He was born on January 30, 1851, in Morris, Otsego County, New York, the son of Congressman Richard Franchot (1816–1875) and Ann (Van Vranken) Franchot (1822–1881). He attended the common schools in Schenectady, and graduated C.E. from Union College in 1871. On May 7, 1874, he married Annie Powers Eells (1852–1935); and they had four children, among them Assemblyman Nicholas V. V. Franchot II (1884–1938).

About 1898, he removed to Niagara Falls, and was general manager of a company which manufactured chemicals.

Franchot was a member of the New York State Senate (47th D.) in 1907 and 1908.

He died on March 24, 1908, in Montreal, Quebec, Canada, after an operation.

New York Superintendent of Public Works Nicholas Van Vranken Franchot (1855–1943) was his brother.

References

1851 births
1908 deaths
Politicians from Niagara Falls, New York
Republican Party New York (state) state senators
People from Morris, New York
Union College (New York) alumni
19th-century American politicians